The Cabinet Secretary is the most senior civil servant in the United Kingdom, and is based in the Cabinet Office. The person in this role acts as the senior policy adviser to the Prime Minister and Cabinet and as the Secretary to the Cabinet, is responsible to all ministers for the efficient running of government. The role is currently occupied by Simon Case.

Origin
The position of Cabinet Secretary was created in 1916 for Sir Maurice Hankey, when the existing secretariat of the Committee of Imperial Defence, headed by Hankey, became secretariat to a newly organised War Cabinet.

Responsibilities

Civil Service
Since 1981 (except for a period 2011–2014), the position of cabinet secretary has been combined with the role of Head of the Home Civil Service. The cabinet secretary used to also hold the position of the permanent secretary of the Cabinet Office, but this has been passed to the chief executive of the civil service. The first means that the cabinet secretary is responsible for all the civil servants of the various departments within government (except the Foreign Office), chairing the Permanent Secretaries Management Group (PSMG) which is the principal governing body of the civil service. The second means that the cabinet secretary is responsible for leading the government department that provides administrative support to the prime minister and Cabinet. The post is appointed by the prime minister with the advice of the out-going cabinet secretary and the First Civil Service Commissioner.

Cabinet
The responsibilities of the job vary from time to time and depend very much on the personal qualities of both the prime minister and cabinet secretary of the day. In most cases the true influence of the cabinet secretary extends far beyond administrative matters, and reaches to the very heart of the decision-making process. For instance, the cabinet secretary is responsible for administering the Ministerial Code which governs the conduct of ministers (also known as the Rule Book and formerly Questions of Procedure for Ministers). In this duty the cabinet secretary may be asked to investigate leaks within government, and enforce Cabinet discipline. Unusually in a democracy, this gives the unelected cabinet secretary some authority over elected ministers (a situation satirised in the BBC sitcom Yes, Prime Minister), although the constitutional authority of the code is somewhat ambiguous.

Intelligence
The cabinet secretary is responsible for overseeing the intelligence services and their relationship to the government, though since 2002 this responsibility has been delegated to a full-time role (initially as Security and Intelligence Co-ordinator, now the Head of Intelligence, Security & Resilience working to the National Security Adviser), with the cabinet secretary focussing on civil service reforms to help deliver the government's policy programme.

2011 restructuring
It was announced on 11 October 2011 that Gus O'Donnell would retire at the end of 2011, and following this the three roles then performed by the cabinet secretary would be split: the cabinet secretary would provide policy advice to the prime minister and Cabinet; the Head of the Civil Service would provide leadership for the whole civil service; and the permanent secretary would oversee the Cabinet Office. It was announced later that the officeholders would be Jeremy Heywood as cabinet secretary, Bob Kerslake as Head of the Civil Service, and Ian Watmore as permanent secretary at the Cabinet Office.

In July 2014 it was announced that Kerslake would step down and Heywood would take the title of head of the Civil Service with a chief executive of the Civil Service reporting to Heywood and holding Watmore's post at the Cabinet Office. Heywood's retirement on health grounds was announced on 24 October 2018, and he was replaced by Mark Sedwill.

List of cabinet secretaries

Timeline of cabinet secretaries

See also 
Prime Minister's Office
Private Secretary
Principal Private Secretary
Permanent secretary

References

External links 
Cabinet Office

Cabinet Office (United Kingdom)
Civil service positions in the United Kingdom
1916 introductions
1916 establishments in the United Kingdom